Potrerillos is a town, with a population of 19,500 (2020 calculation), and a municipality in the Honduran department of Cortés. The municipality was founded in 1875.

References

Populated places in Honduras
Cortés Department
Populated places established in 1875